Ignacio Morales (born 12 August 1995) is a Chilean taekwondo athlete.

He competed at the 2016 Summer Olympics in Rio de Janeiro, in the men's 68 kg.

In 2017, he competed in the men's featherweight event at the 2017 World Taekwondo Championships held in Muju, South Korea.

References

External links
 

1995 births
Living people
Chilean male taekwondo practitioners
Olympic taekwondo practitioners of Chile
Taekwondo practitioners at the 2016 Summer Olympics
Taekwondo practitioners at the 2015 Pan American Games
Taekwondo practitioners at the 2019 Pan American Games
Pan American Games medalists in taekwondo
Pan American Games bronze medalists for Chile
Medalists at the 2019 Pan American Games
Sportspeople from Santiago
21st-century Chilean people
South American Games gold medalists for Chile
South American Games medalists in taekwondo
Competitors at the 2014 South American Games
Competitors at the 2018 South American Games
Competitors at the 2022 South American Games